"With Me" is a song recorded by American group Destiny's Child for their eponymous debut studio album (1998). The song was produced by Jermaine Dupri and Manuel Seal Jr., and contains elements of Master P's song "Freak Hoes". According to the group, "With Me" was written as an answer song to Usher's "You Make Me Wanna...".

"With Me" was released on April 20, 1998, as the second and final single from Destiny's Child by Columbia Records. Critically acclaimed, it was a moderate commercial success, peaking at number 19 on the UK Singles Chart.

Music video
The accompanying music video for "With Me" was directed by Darren Grant, who directed Destiny's Child's previous two music videos for "No, No, No", and used the song's Part 1. The group's members appear in four different settings: Beyoncé appears as a mermaid in a bluish water scene, LaTavia Roberson appears as a genie in an orange-colored room, Kelly Rowland is a giantess in a city nightclub, and LeToya Luckett is a "spider-woman" climbing a web made of metal chains with a purple background. The members appear together in gray outfits in one scene and in red dresses in a dark room covered with eyes. Jermaine Dupri also appears, watching the women in a slideshow. Beyoncé's younger sister Solange makes a cameo as well.

Commercial performance
In the United States, "With Me" was ineligible to enter the Billboard Hot 100 and Hot R&B/Hip-Hop Songs due to its airplay-only release, as Billboards rules at the time allowed only commercially-available singles to chart. Consequently, "With Me" managed to enter only the R&B/Hip-Hop Airplay and Rhythmic charts, peaking at numbers 36 and 35, respectively.

"With Me" entered the UK Singles Chart on July 11, 1998, at number 19, which became its peak. In the Netherlands, the song peaked at number 83 on the Dutch Single Top 100, spending three weeks on the chart.

Track listings and formats

European maxi and UK CD1 singles
"With Me" (Part 1) (featuring JD) – 3:27
"With Me" (Part 2) (featuring Master P) – 4:14
"With Me" (Part 1) (instrumental) – 3:28
"Second Nature" – 5:09

UK CD2 single
"With Me" (Full Crew Radio Version) – 3:42
"With Me" (Full Crew Revocaled Radio Version) – 3:55
"With Me" (Full Crew Main Mix W/Rap) – 4:03
"With Me" (Full Crew Main Mix No Rap) – 4:03

US promotional CD single
"With Me" (Part 2) (radio edit) (featuring Master P) – 3:36
"With Me" (Part 2) (no rap) (featuring Master P) – 2:39
"With Me" (Part 1) (album version) (featuring JD) – 3:27
"With Me" (Part 3) (UK mix radio edit) (featuring Full Crew) – 3:53
"With Me" (Part 4) (UK mix with rap) (featuring Full Crew) – 4:03
"With Me" (Part 2) (instrumental) – 4:14
"With Me" (Part 4) (instrumental) – 4:03
"With Me" (Part 2) (Callout Hook #1) – 0:10
"With Me" (Part 2) (Callout Hook #2) – 0:05
"With Me" (Part 3) (Callout Hook #1) – 0:10
"With Me" (Part 3) (Callout Hook #2) – 0:05

Charts

Release history

Notes

References

1998 singles
Destiny's Child songs
Music videos directed by Darren Grant
Song recordings produced by Jermaine Dupri
Songs written by Manuel Seal
Songs written by Jermaine Dupri
Songs written by Beyoncé
Songs written by Kelly Rowland
Songs written by LeToya Luckett
1998 songs
Columbia Records singles
Songs written by LaTavia Roberson